Álvaro Pombo García de los Ríos (born 23 June 1939) is a Spanish poet, novelist and activist.

Born in Santander, Cantabria, he studied at the Complutense University of Madrid and received a Bachelor of Arts in philosophy at Birkbeck, University of London, where he lived between 1966 and 1977. His first book of poetry, Protocolos, was published in 1973, and four years later he won the El Bardo prize for his 1977 Variaciones. Returning to Spain that year, he published a collection of short stories, Relatos sobre la falta de sustancia, many of which contained homosexual characters and themes.

Pombo was elected to seat j of the Real Academia Española on 19 December 2002, he took up his seat on 20 June 2004.

Prizes and Rewards 
 In October 2006, Pombo was awarded the Premio Planeta literary prize for his novel La fortuna de Matilda Turpin.
 In 2012 he was awarded the Premio Nadal for his novel El temblor del héroe.

Works 

Novels
 El héroe de las mansardas de Mansard (1983)
 El hijo adoptivo (1986)
 Los delitos insignificantes (1986)
 El parecido (1988)
 El metro de platino iridiado (1990)
 Aparición del eterno femenino contada por S. M. el Rey (1993)
 Telepena de Cecilia Cecilia Villalobo (1995)
 Vida de san Francisco de Asís (1996)
 Donde las mujeres (1996)
 La cuadratura del círculo (1999)
 El cielo raso (2001)
 Una ventana al norte (2004)
 Contra natura (2005)
 La fortuna de Matilda Turpin (2006)
 Virginia o el interior del mundo (2009)
 La previa muerte del lugarteniente Aloof (2009)
 El temblor del héroe (2012)

Short stories
 Relatos sobre la falta de sustancia (1977)
 Cuentos reciclados (1997)

Poetry
 Protocolos (1973)
 Variaciones (1977)
 Hacia una constitución poética del año en curso (1980)
 Protocolos para la rehabilitación del firmamento (1992)
 Protocolos, 1973-2003 (2004)
 Los enunciados protocolarios (2009)

Essays
 Alrededores (2002)

References

1939 births
Living people
People from Santander, Spain
20th-century Spanish novelists
21st-century Spanish novelists
Alumni of Birkbeck, University of London
Writers from Cantabria
Complutense University of Madrid alumni
Spanish gay writers
Gay politicians
Spanish LGBT poets
Spanish LGBT novelists
Members of the Royal Spanish Academy
Spanish male poets
Spanish male novelists
20th-century Spanish poets
20th-century Spanish male writers
Union, Progress and Democracy politicians
21st-century Spanish poets
21st-century Spanish male writers